The Italy women's national volleyball team is governed by the Federazione Italiana Pallavolo (FIPAV). The team's biggest victories were the gold medal at the 2002 FIVB Women's World Championship, being the first team to break the domination of Russia, Cuba, China and Japan, and the 2007 and the 2011 World Cup, winning 21 out of the 22 matches in both tournaments.

Results

Summer Olympics
 Champions   Runners-up   Third place   Fourth place

World Championship
 Champions   Runners-up   Third place   Fourth place

  2002 —  Gold medal
 Anzanello, Borrelli, Cardullo, Leggeri, Lo Bianco, Mello, Mifkova, Paggi, Piccinini, Rinieri, Sangiuliano, Togut. Head Coach: Bonitta

World Cup
 Champions   Runners-up   Third place   Fourth place

  2007 —  Gold medal
 Anzanello, Guiggi, Barazza, Secolo, Cardullo, Ortolani, Aguero, Ferretti, Lo Bianco, Del Core, Gioli. Head Coach: Barbolini
  2011 —  Gold medal
 Anzanello, Barcellini, Croce, De Gennaro, Costagrande, C. Bosetti, Sirressi, Arrighetti, Lo Bianco, Del Core, L. Bosetti, Gioli, Signorile, Folie. Head Coach: Barbolini

World Grand Champions Cup
2009 —  gold medal

World Grand Prix
 Champions   Runners-up   Third place   Fourth place

Nations League
 Champions   Runners-up   Third place   Fourth place

  2022 —  gold medal

European Championship
 Champions   Runners-up   Third place   Fourth place

  2007 —  Gold medal
 Gioli, Croce, Fiorin, Guiggi, Barazza, Secolo, Ortolani, Aguero, Ferretti, Lo Bianco, Del Core, Cardullo. Head Coach: Barbolini
  2009 —  Gold medal
 Crisanti, Rondon, Merlo, Barazza, Secolo, Cardullo, Ortolani, Piccinini, Arrighetti, Lo Bianco, Del Core, Bosetti, Gioli, Agüero. Head Coach: Barbolini
  2021 —  Gold medal
 Gennari, Bonifacio, Malinov, De Gennaro, Orro, Chirichella, Danesi, Fahr, Pietrini, Nwakalor, Sylla, Egonu, Parrocchiale, Mazzaro, Sofia D'Odorico. Head Coach: Mazzanti

Mediterranean Games
1975 —  silver medal
1979 —  gold medal
1983 —  gold medal
1987 —  bronze medal
1991 —  gold medal
1997 —  gold medal
2001 —  gold medal
2005 —  bronze medal
2009 —  gold medal
2013 —  gold medal
2018 — 5th
2022 —  gold medal

Team

Current squad
The following is the Italian roster in the 2021 European Championship.

Head coach: Davide Mazzanti

Previous squads
The following is the Italian roster in the 2018 World Championship.

Head coach: Davide Mazzanti

Notable players
 Paola Egonu
 Simona Gioli
 Carolina Costagrande
 Paola Croce
 Francesca Piccinini
 Elisa Togut
 Valentina Arrighetti
 Taismary Agüero
 Eleonora Lo Bianco
 Antonella Del Core
 Simona Rinieri
 Manuela Leggeri
 Manuela Benelli
 Paola Cardullo
 Sabrina Bertini
 Darina Mifkova
 Sara Anzanello
 Maurizia Cacciatori 
 Raffaella Calloni
 Paola Paggi
 Nadia Centoni
 Jenny Barazza
 Annamaria Marasi
 Martina Guiggi

References

External links

Official website
FIVB profile

National women's volleyball teams
Volleyball
Volleyball in Italy
Women's volleyball in Italy
World champion national volleyball teams